The 2010 season for the  cycling team began in January with the Tour Down Under and ended in October at the Chrono des Nations. As a UCI ProTour team, they were automatically invited and obligated to send a squad to every ProTour event.

Personnel-wise, the team was mostly unchanged from the 2009 season. Its manager, as it has been since its inception in 1997, was former cyclist Marc Madiot.

For the 2011 season, the team will ride as a UCI Professional Continental team. Only the top 20 teams from 2010 in the UCI's points system were eligible for ProTeam status, and FDJ finished 21st in that ranking.

2010 roster
Ages as of January 1, 2010.

Riders who joined the team for the 2010 season

Riders who left the team during or after the 2009 season

One-day races

Spring classics

Fall races

Stage races
The team scored three victories at the Tour Méditerranéen, with Hutarovich in stages 1 and 3 and Veikkanen in stage 2. Veikkanen's stage win gave him the overall race lead, but he was unable to hold it through the conclusion of the race, losing it on the final day to Alejandro Valverde. Française des Jeux' early season successes continued at the Tour du Haut Var, when Le Mével won the second stage of the two-day event, and with it the overall.

Grand Tours
As they did in 2009, Française des Jeux declined to participate in the Giro d'Italia.

Tour de France
FDJ, as they became known shortly before the Tour de France began, entered the race with a squad led by Le Mével, tenth-place finisher and best French rider in 2009. In stage 1, the first road race stage after the prologue time trial, several crashes took place in the final few kilometers, meaning only five riders were at the front of the race to contest the sprint finish. Ladagnous avoided crashing and made this little selection, though he was last of the five riders in the kick to the finish. Ladagnous took a meaningless ninth place the next day, as the peloton decided not to race to the finish, neutralizing the results for all but stage winner Sylvain Chavanel. In stage 9, Casar made a breakaway of 10 riders, including such big names as Luis León Sánchez, Damiano Cunego, and Jens Voigt. All of them figured into the day's results. Race favorites Alberto Contador and Andy Schleck broke away from the other top riders in the race on this day. Voigt dropped back and paced them so long and so strenuously that they joined the leaders on the road, now a five-rider group including Casar, Sánchez, and Cunego. Contador and Schleck finished sixth and seventh on the day, not seeking the stage win. For their parts, Sánchez, Cunego, and Casar finished 2 seconds ahead as the three of them did aggressively seek the win. Cunego started his sprint early and had a gap for a moment, but Casar perhaps knew the course better, taking an aggressive line on the course's final left-hand turn. The finish line was just after that turn, so Casar made it across first and won the stage.

In stage 13, Geslin finished seventh on the stage, sixth in the sprint behind solo winner Alexander Vinokourov. Three days later in stage 16, Casar came close to a second victory. He was part of a day-long breakaway, that included Lance Armstrong, and finished second behind Pierrick Fédrigo in the sprint finish. Casar finished the race in 25th place, the team's best finisher, just under 46 minutes behind Tour champion Alberto Contador. Le Mével was 42nd, more than an hour and 22 minutes back. The squad finished 15th in the teams classification.

Vuelta a España

Season victories

Footnotes

References

2010 road cycling season by team
FDJ
2010 in French sport